Massimiliano Carlini (born 20 August 1986) is an Italian footballer who plays as a winger for  club Monterosi.

Career
On 28 July 2018, he signed a two-year contract with the Serie C club Juve Stabia.

On 28 January 2020, Carlini joined Catanzaro on a 1.5-year contract.

References

External links

1986 births
Living people
People from Terracina
Footballers from Lazio
Italian footballers
Association football midfielders
Serie A players
Serie B players
Serie C players
A.C. Isola Liri players
Frosinone Calcio players
A.S. Sambenedettese players
Calcio Lecco 1912 players
A.S.D. Sorrento players
U.S. Cremonese players
Casertana F.C. players
A.C. Reggiana 1919 players
S.S. Juve Stabia players
U.S. Catanzaro 1929 players
Monterosi Tuscia F.C. players
Sportspeople from the Province of Latina